Leavey is a surname. Notable people with the surname include:

 Dorothy Leavey (1897–1998), American philanthropist
 Herbert Leavey, English footballer known as John Leavey
 James Leavey (born 1947), British writer and journalist
 Maria Leavey (1954–2006), American political consultant
 Megan Leavey (1983–), former US Marine and subject of the film Megan Leavey
 Nick Leavey (born 1986), British sprinter
 Thomas E. Leavey (died 1980), American philanthropist
 Tony Leavey (1915–1999), British businessman and politician

See also
 Leavey Center, indoor basketball arena in Santa Clara, California, United States